The 1992 Ibero-American Championships in Athletics (Spanish: V Campeonato Iberoamericano de Atletismo) was the fifth edition of the international athletics competition between Ibero-American nations which was held at the Estadio Olímpico de La Cartuja in Seville, Spain from 17–19 July. A total of 41 track and field events were contested (22 by men and 19 by women) and 14 new championship records were set.

The 1992 Barcelona Olympics were to be celebrated a month later and, as a result of timing and location, the Ibero-American Championships attracted a number of top foreign athletes who were preparing for the Olympics. A record high of 462 athletes representing 22 nations participated at the competition. The combination of high participation and performances made the 1992 edition one of the most successful in Ibero-American Championships history. The event fell within the cultural programme of the Seville Expo '92.

The Cuban delegation was the most successful: it won all four relay races and all but two of the men's and women's field events. Cuban athletes won 23 of the 41 events and ended the competition with a medal count of 36. Brazil had the second best team performance, with eight event winners from 27 medallists, while the host nation Spain had the next highest totals with three gold medals and 26 medals in total.

The marathon races were not included in the programme in 1992 (a permanent change) and were instead held separately in Barcelona that year, with Spaniards Rodrigo Gavela and Ana Isabel Alonso taking the honours. The women's triple jump was contested for the first time and Cuba's Niurka Montalvo did a long and triple jump double. Carmem de Oliveira of Brazil won both the 3000 metres and 10,000 metres races. Nineteen-year-old Iván Pedroso broke the championship record in the men's long jump. Robson da Silva won the men's 200 metres for a record fourth time consecutively.

The men's high jump winner Javier Sotomayor became Olympic champion the following August. Among other competitors, Ximena Restrepo and Ana Fidelia Quirot (the winners of the 400 m and 800 m races) went on to win Olympic bronzes at the 1992 Barcelona Games, while the winning Cuban men's relay teams also reached the Olympic podium.

Medal summary

Men

Women

Medal table

The medallists from the 1992 Ibero-American Marathon Championship (held separately in Barcelona) were later included in the official medal count. The table above excludes these medals.

Participation
For the first time in the history of the competition, all twenty-two members of the Asociación Iberoamericana de Atletismo were present at the championships. Reflecting this, the number of competing athletes (462) was more than double that of the previous edition.  However, only 412 participating athletes (including some guests) were counted by analysing the official result list.  The higher number probably contains coaches and/or officials registered for the event.

 (36)
 (14)
 (40)
 (15)
 (16)
 (5)
 (44)
 (5)
 (14)
 (6)
 (6)
 (10)
 (37)
 (6)
 (3)
 (10)
 (7)
 (34)
 (10)
 (76)
 (8)
 (10)

References

Results
El Atletismo Ibero-Americano – San Fernando 2010. RFEA. Retrieved on 2011-11-18.

Ibero-American Championships in Athletics
Ibero-American
Ibero-American
Ath
Sports competitions in Seville
Ibero-American Championships
20th century in Seville